Neonesomia is a genus of North American flowering plants in the aster tribe within the sunflower family.

The genus is named in honor of American botanist Guy L. Nesom.

 Species
 Neonesomia johnstonii (G.L.Nesom) Urbatsch & R.P.Roberts - San Luis Potosí
 Neonesomia palmeri (A.Gray) Urbatsch & R.P.Roberts - Tamaulipas, Nuevo León, southern Texas

References

Flora of North America
Asteraceae genera
Astereae